Austria competed at the 2000 Summer Olympics in Sydney, Australia. 92 competitors, 55 men and 37 women, took part in 68 events in 17 sports.

Medalists

Athletics

Men
Track and road events

Field events

Combined events – Decathlon

Women
Track and road events

Field events

Beach volleyball

Canoeing

Sprint

Slalom

Cycling

Road

Track

Diving

Equestrian

Dressage
(Total scores are the average of all three rounds for the individual competition, and the three best total scores of individual round 1 for the team competition.)

Jumping

Fencing

Six fencers, five men and one woman, represented Austria in 2000.

Men

Handball

Team roster
 Ausra Fridrikas
 Barbara Strass
 Doris Meltzer
 Iris Morhammer
 Laura Fritz
 Natalia Rusnatchenko
 Sorina Teodorovic
 Stanka Bozovic
 Steffi Ofenböck
 Svetlana Mugoša-Antić
 Tanja Logvin
 Tatjana Dschandschgawa
 Birgit Engl
 Ariane Maier
 Rima Sypkus

Preliminary round

Quarterfinal

5–8th place semifinals

Fifth place game

Judo

Men

Rowing

Men

Sailing

Four men and one woman participated in the sailing competition for Austria. They won two gold medals.
Men

Women

Open

Shooting

Men

Women

Swimming

Men

Women

Table tennis

Men

Women

Taekwondo

Tennis

Women

Triathlon

Notes

Wallechinsky, David (2004). The Complete Book of the Summer Olympics (Athens 2004 Edition). Toronto, Canada. . 
International Olympic Committee (2001). The Results. Retrieved 12 November 2005.
Sydney Organising Committee for the Olympic Games (2001). Official Report of the XXVII Olympiad Volume 1: Preparing for the Games. Retrieved 20 November 2005.
Sydney Organising Committee for the Olympic Games (2001). Official Report of the XXVII Olympiad Volume 2: Celebrating the Games. Retrieved 20 November 2005.
Sydney Organising Committee for the Olympic Games (2001). The Results. Retrieved 20 November 2005.
International Olympic Committee Web Site

References

Nations at the 2000 Summer Olympics
2000 Summer Olympics
Summer Olympics